Trafficked is a 2017 American thriller drama film directed by Will Wallace and starring Ashley Judd, Sean Patrick Flanery and Anne Archer.

Plot
In California, Sara is eighteen and has to leave her foster home; she is offered training to be a waitress working on cruise ships. She accepts, but instead is sold to sex traffickers by Diane. In India, young teen Amba is partying with her friends when a guy she'd rejected tries to hit on her again. He is thrown out. On her way back home, he throws acid on her and her friend. Her friend is facially disfigured and Amba's hand is scarred. Then he forces Amba to be sold into sex slavery. Sara and Amba both wind up together in a Texas brothel with Mali, from Nigeria, and are raped repeatedly. Mali tells them to do what they can to survive, and not to fight back. Amba, hopeless, listens, but Sara resists and is beaten and drugged.
Amba gets pregnant and Simon (Sean Patrick Flanery), the owner of the brothel, finds out and makes her take pills to have an abortion. She loses a lot of blood and Mali pleads with Simon to call a doctor.

He does, and Sara discreetly begs the doctor for some sleeping pills "for her friend." He relents.

Sara plots with Amba and Mali to escape. She tells them that Simon is going away with the rest of his men for the night, and only Max, one of the guards, will be left. Sara says that they could catch a train nearby. Mali agrees, but Amba, still depressed over her abortion, says that she won't leave. She thinks her family would be too ashamed of her when they find out what she's been doing.

Sara puts in the sleeping pills in Max's drink, and once he's asleep, she sneaks out with Mali. Amba changes her mind and goes with them. Sara grabs the keys to the front gate from Max, but he awakens and chokes her. Mali hits him and knocks him out, and the three girls run.

They get to the train station, but are too late; the train has already left. Mali trips and injures her ankle. Meanwhile, Simon has found out they escaped and runs back. Gameboy, another guard, searches the station, which is also a truck stop, and hears Mali's yells of pain. Mali tells Amba and Sara to run away, and they finally do, reluctant to leave her. 
Mali is captured and Sara and Amba run and hide in a truck. They are taken to a bus station, where they buy two tickets. They get in the bus and see Simon, who has tracked them there and is searching the buses. They duck and hide and manage to evade him.
Sara is reunited with her younger sister and Amba calls her family, who are overjoyed to hear from her. Simon and Diane are arrested, along with everyone else involved in trafficking. As for Mali, she is shown with a group of prostitutes, holding one of them and crying as the one she was holding is taken away.

Cast
Ashley Judd as Diane
Anne Archer as Mother Monica
Patrick Duffy as Christian
Elisabeth Röhm as Rachel Anderson
Sean Patrick Flanery as Simon
Brian Thompson as Max
Efren Ramirez as Enrique
Matt Doran as Gameboy
Jason London as Roy
Madison Wolfe as Natalie
Zak Lee Guarnaccia as Italian Trafficker
Kelly Washington as Sara
Amiah Miller as Young Sara
Jessica Obilom as Mali
Alpa Banker as Amba
Nikki Koss as Jessie
Duane Whitaker as Joe Mac
Courtney Gains as Frank Anderson
Hina X. Khan as Jyoti
Rodrigo Trevino as Jesus
Kayla Vosburg as Butter

Controversy 
Actresses alleged that they were bruised in an unusually physical audition; one alleged that a simulated rape scene was performed on her without warning, and the director, Will Wallace, was removed from the project during post production over a disagreement involving the depiction of rape.

Reception
On review aggregator Rotten Tomatoes, the film has an approval rating of 29% based on 7 reviews, with an average rating of 4.3/10.  Jeffrey M. Anderson of Common Sense Media awarded the film one star out of five.

References

External links
 
 
 
 

American thriller drama films
Films about prostitution in the United States
Films about human trafficking
Works about sex trafficking
2017 thriller drama films
2017 drama films
2010s English-language films
Films directed by Will Wallace
2010s American films